The Howrah–New Jalpaiguri line is a railway line connecting  with   in North Bengal in the Indian state of West Bengal. The line continues through North Bengal and western part of Assam to connect with Guwahati. The – link allows trains from another terminus  in Calcutta to use this route. The line uses a major part of the Barharwa–Azimganj–Katwa loop. Other parts of West Bengal and Bihar are well-connected to this line. It is under the administrative jurisdiction of Eastern Railway and Northeast Frontier Railway.

Sections 
The ) long trunk line, been treated in more detail in smaller sections:

 Howrah–Bandel–Katwa section
 Barharwa–Azimganj–Katwa loop
 Barsoi–New Farakka section
 Katihar–New Jalpaiguri, Thakurganj and Siliguri sections

The route is as follows :

0    	

95    	

146    	

207     	

293      	

328      	

473       	

561

Earlier development
During the British period all connections to North Bengal were through the eastern part of Bengal. From 1878, the railway route from Calcutta (now spelt Kolkata) to Siliguri was in two laps. The first lap was a 185 km journey along the Eastern Bengal State Railway from Calcutta Station (later renamed Sealdah) to Damookdeah Ghat on the southern bank of the Padma River, then across the river in a ferry and the second lap of the journey. A 336 km metre-gauge line of the North Bengal Railway linked Saraghat on the northern bank of the Padma to Siliguri.

The route till 1947 thus ran: 
0 
 
 
 
 Bheramara–Hardinge Bridge
 
 
 
 Parabtipur
 Nilphamari
 
 
 Siliguri.

Post-partition development
With the partition of India in 1947, a major portion of the Calcutta–Siliguri line ran through East Pakistan, now Bangladesh. With several rail links in Bihar, the attention was on those links, and new links were developed. However, one hurdle stood out. There was no bridge across the Ganga river even in Bihar. A generally acceptable route to Siliguri was via Sahibganj loop to Sakrigali ghat. Across the Ganges by ferry to Manihari Ghat. In 1949 Kishanganj–Siliguri section was converted to metre gauge.

In the early 1960s, when Farakka Barrage was being  constructed, a far reaching change was made. Indian Railways constructed a new broad-gauge rail link from south Bengal. , a new broad-gauge station was built south of Siliguri Town.

Reorganisation in the Siliguri area
The Darjeeling Himalayan Railway came up as a narrow-gauge (2 feet) railway in 1881. In 1915, it was extended up the Teesta Valley to Gielle Kola and to the south to Kishenganj. In 1949 Kishanganj – Siliguri was converted from narrow-gauge to metre-gauge and extended north-east into Assam, partly along the narrow-gauge Teesta Valley route. Along with development of the metre-gauge line,  a new Siliguri Junction station, north of the traditional Siliguri Town station, became the main station in the area. With the development of the broad-gauge system and the New Jalpaiguri station, the narrow gauge DHR was extended to New Jalpaiguri.

The earlier Siliguri–Kishanganj metre-gauge line is now part of the Siliguri–Kishnaganj–Katihar metre-gauge line. Part of the metre-gauge track runs parallel to the broad-gauge track and part of it has a separate route.

The Siliguri–Haldibari, part of the original broad gauge Calcutta–Siliguri track via Hardinge Bridge, got delinked from the trunk route because of partition in 1947. As all the other tracks in the area were metre gauge, it was converted from broad gauge to mere gauge in the late forties. When New Jalpaiguri station came up, the line was extended to New Jalpiguri. When broad-gauge lines were laid in the area, it was reconverted to broad gauge and now functions as the Haldibari–New Jalpaiguri line.

Assam link
The railway system in Assam got delinked from the rest of India in 1947. In order to establish a link with Assam, the Assam Rail Link Project, connecting Kishanganj with Fakirgram was started on a war footing on 26 January 1948. A 229 km-long metre-gauge line was built and commissioned in two years.  The Kishanganj branch of the Darjeeling Himalayan Railway was taken over and converted to metre gauge. It was connected to the North Eastern Railway network at Barsoi. The Teesta Valley Line up to Sivok was taken over and converted to metre gauge. The link spanned three major rivers – Teesta, Torsha, and Sankosh.  The Kishanganj–Naxalbari section was completed on 31 July 1948, the Naxalbari–New Bagrakot section on 26 January 1950, the Madarihat–Hashimara section on 25 December 1949 and Alipurduar–Fakirgram section on 26 January 1950.

In the seventies a new broad-gauge line was laid between New Jalpaiguri and Guwahati. The entire Barauni–Katihar–Guwahati line is being electrified.

Branch lines
The Katihar–Barsoi–Raiganj–Radhikapur–Dinajpur–Parabatipur line is now operated on the Indian side up to  only. The transit facility in the Radhikapur–Birol sector is virtually closed. The railway track on the Indian side has been converted to broad gauge while that on the Bangladesh side remains metre gauge.

Bangladesh started export of fertilizer to Nepal utilizing the Rahanpur–Singhabad transit point in November 2011.

The -long – broad-gauge line was opened  in 2004. Extension of the Eklakhi–Balurghat branch line to Hili was announced in the Rail Budget for 2010–11.

See also  Barharwa–Azimganj–Katwa loop for other branch lines along this route.

Railway electrification
Fully electrified. Passenger service with electric locomotives initiated on 09.01.2020.

Trains
Some of the important trains running through this line are as follows:
 Howrah-New Jalpaiguri Vande Bharat Express
 Howrah-New Jalpaiguri Shatabdi Express
 Howrah–New Jalpaiguri AC Superfast Express
 Sealdah-New Jalpaiguri Superfast Darjeeling Mail
 Sealdah-New Alipurduar Padatik Superfast Express
 Sealdah-Alipurduar Kanchan Kanya Express
 Sealdah-New Alipurduar Teesta Torsha Express
 Sealdah-Malda Town Gour Express
 Sealdah-Bamanhat Uttar Banga Express
 Sealdah–Silchar Kanchenjunga Express
 Sealdah–Agartala Kanchenjunga Express
 Sealdah-Rampurhat Intercity Express
 Sealdah-Rampurhat Maa Taara Express
 Sealdah-Saharsa Hate Bazare Express
 Howrah-Dibrugarh  Kamrup Express
 Howrah–Malda Town Intercity Express
 Howrah-Guwahati Saraighat Superfast Express
 Howrah–Rampurhat Express
 Howrah-Bolpur Shantiniketan Express
 Howrah-Azimganj Ganadevata Express
 Howrah-Radhikapur Kulik Express
 Howrah–Jamalpur Express
 Howrah–Gaya Express
 Howrah–Malda Town Intercity Express
 Howrah–Azimganj Kavi Guru Express
 Howrah-Malda Town Express via Azimganj
 Howrah–Katihar Weekly Express
 Digha-New Jalpaiguri Paharia Express
 Digha–Malda Town Express
 Kolkata-Dibrugarh Superfast Express
 Kolkata–Haldibari Intercity Express
 Kolkata–Jogbani Express
 Kolkata–Guwahati Garib Rath Express
 Kolkata–Radhikapur Express
 Kolkata-Balurghat Tebhaga Express

References

|

5 ft 6 in gauge railways in India
Rail transport in West Bengal
Transport in Siliguri
Transport in Jalpaiguri
Rail transport in Howrah